Charlebury was the name of three ships operated by Alexander Shipping Co Ltd.

, acquired 1921, sold 1935
, torpedoed and sunk in 1942
, ex Empire Clive, purchased 1946, sold 1958

Ship names